The Petersburg Historic District in Petersburg, Tennessee is a  historic district which was listed on the National Register of Historic Places in 1985.  The listing included 126 contributing buildings and three contributing sites.

References

National Register of Historic Places in Fayette County, Tennessee
National Register of Historic Places in Lincoln County, Tennessee
Greek Revival architecture in Tennessee
Victorian architecture in Tennessee
Colonial Revival architecture in Tennessee